Jonathan Gee is a British jazz musician. He was voted Guardian/Wire British Jazz Awards "Most Promising Newcomer" in the 1991 and has played in many jazz trios since then.

Gee was born in Jaffa, Israel, but his family soon relocated to London, England.  He developed his interest in jazz whilst attending Sheffield University. His work has appeared on over 40 albums.

References

External links
 Jonathan Gee Trio

British jazz musicians
Living people
Year of birth missing (living people)